43 Things was a social networking service established as an online goal setting community.  It was built on the principles of tagging, rather than creating explicit interpersonal links (as seen in Friendster and Orkut).  Users created accounts and then listed a number of goals or hopes; these goals were parsed by a lexer and connected to other people's goals that were constructed with similar words or ideas.  This concept is also known as folksonomy. Users could set up to 43 goals, and were encouraged to explore the lists of other users and "cheer" them on towards achieving their goals. In 2005, 43 Things won the Webby Award for the best social networking service.

The 43 Things website went offline on New Years Day, 2015.

History
43 Things was launched on January 1, 2005, by the Robot Co-op, a small company based in Seattle founded by blogger and developer Buster Benson (né Erik Benson), Maktub keyboardist Daniel Spils, and former Amazon.com and Microsoft executive Josh Petersen. 43things.com became read-only on August 15, 2014, and shut down January 1, 2015.

Critique
According to "43 Things: A Community Study," 43 Things had two shortcomings: (1) it failed to have a central area containing documentation about the website and (2) it relied heavily upon RSS, which is unfamiliar to a large portion of users. Regardless, it received solid reviews in regards to responsiveness and user suggestion integration.

Awards
In 2005, 43 Things won the Webby Award for the best social networking service.

References

External links
 43 Things

Amazon (company)
Defunct social networking services
American social networking websites
Companies based in Seattle
Internet properties established in 2005
Defunct American websites